Alta Vista High School is a public charter high school in Tucson, Arizona. It is operated by The Leona Group.

References

Public high schools in Arizona
The Leona Group
Charter schools in Arizona